The fourth and final season of the reimagined science fiction television series Battlestar Galactica premiered on the Sci-Fi Channel in the United States on April 4, 2008, and concluded on March 20, 2009. Similar to the second season, it was split into two parts, each containing 10 episodes. "Season 4.0" aired from April to June 2008 and "Season 4.5" aired from January to March 2009. The fourth season contained 20 episodes, plus the television film Razor.

Cast and characters

Main cast
 Edward James Olmos as William Adama
 Mary McDonnell as Laura Roslin
 Katee Sackhoff as Kara "Starbuck" Thrace
 Jamie Bamber as Lee "Apollo" Adama
 James Callis as Gaius Baltar
 Tricia Helfer as Number Six
 Grace Park as Sharon "Boomer" Valerii/Sharon "Athena" Agathon (Number Eight)
 Michael Hogan as Saul Tigh
 Aaron Douglas as Galen Tyrol
 Tahmoh Penikett as Karl "Helo" Agathon
 Michael Trucco as Samuel Anders
 Nicki Clyne as Cally Henderson Tyrol
 Kandyse McClure as Anastasia Dualla
 Alessandro Juliani as Felix Gaeta

Recurring cast
 Donnelly Rhodes as Sherman Cottle
 Rekha Sharma as Tory Foster
 Callum Keith Rennie as Leoben Conoy (Number Two)
 Lucy Lawless as D'Anna Biers (Number Three)
 Dean Stockwell as John Cavil (Number One)
 Matthew Bennett as Aaron Doral (Number Five)
 Rick Worthy as Simon (Number Four)
 Richard Hatch as Tom Zarek
 Kate Vernon as Ellen Tigh
 Mark Sheppard as Romo Lampkin
 Leah Cairns as Margaret "Racetrack" Edmondson
 Bodie Olmos as Brendan "Hot Dog" Costanza
 Jennifer Halley as Diana "Hardball" Seelix

Episodes

Production
During the hiatus after season 3, the writers had a retreat in Lake Tahoe where they planned much of the story arc for the fourth season, mainly mapping out the storylines of the first 10 episodes. In June 2007, the Sci-Fi Channel confirmed the fourth season would be its final season, with an order of 22 episodes, an increase from 13 as originally announced. Production of the final season began in May 2007. A special TV movie, titled Battlestar Galactica: Razor, aired on November 24, 2007. The regular season began airing on April 4, 2008.

Only the first 12 episodes of season four (including Razor, which is technically the first two episodes of the 22 ordered for season 4) were filmed before the 2007–2008 Writers Guild of America strike halted production of all scripted TV shows. After the strike ended, the final 10 episodes began airing on January 16, 2009.

Reception
The season received universal acclaim from critics, scoring 85 out of 100 based on 16 reviews from Metacritic. On Rotten Tomatoes, the season has an approval rating of 92% with an average score of 8.1 out of 10 based on 38 reviews. The website's critical consensus reads, "Battlestar Galacticas final season proves a satisfying conclusion to TV's best science fiction offering." The series also placed on numerous critics top ten lists of both 2008 and 2009 by publications such as the Chicago Tribune, San Francisco Chronicle, The Star-Ledger, Time and TV Guide.

The fourth season received a total of eleven Emmy Award nominations. "Season 4.0" received six nominations at the 60th Primetime Emmy Awards, for Outstanding Writing for a Drama Series (Michael Angeli for "Six of One"), Outstanding Cinematography for a One-Hour Series (Stephen McNutt for Razor), Outstanding Single-Camera Picture Editing for a Drama Series ("He That Believeth in Me"), and Outstanding Sound Mixing for a Comedy or Drama Series (One-Hour) (Razor); and won for Outstanding Special Visual Effects for a Series ("He That Believeth in Me") and Outstanding Special Class – Short-Format Live-Action Entertainment Programs (Razor Flashbacks). "Season 4.5" received five nominations at the 61st Primetime Emmy Awards, with the episode "Daybreak, Part 2" receiving all the series' nominations, for Outstanding Directing for a Drama Series (Michael Rymer), Outstanding Single Camera Picture Editing for a Drama Series, Outstanding Sound Mixing for a Comedy or Drama Series (One Hour), and Outstanding Special Visual Effects for a Series; and won for Outstanding Sound Editing for a Series.

For the 10 regular episodes, Battlestar Galactica averaged a 1.7 Nielsen household rating and 2.2 million total viewers. This represented an increase of 13% in household rating and 11% in total viewers. The series finale received 2.4 million viewers and became the most-watched episode of the series in over three years.

Home video releases
Similar to the second season, the fourth season was split into two parts, as well the DVD and Blu-ray sets. Season 4.0 was released on DVD in region 1 on January 6, 2009, in region 2 (although simply titled "Season 4") on October 6, 2008 and in region 4 (titled "Season 4: Part 1") on December 3, 2008. Season 4.5 was released on DVD in region 1 on July 28, 2009, in region 2 (titled "The Final Season") on June 1, 2009 and in region 4 (titled "Season 4: Part 2 – The Final Chapter") on July 28, 2009. The complete fourth season was released on Blu-ray Disc in region 1 on January 4, 2011.

The Season 4.0 DVD set includes the first 10 episodes of season four and the television film Razor. The Razor disc includes the broadcast version as well as the unrated extended version. Executive producer Ronald D. Moore and writer Michael Taylor provide commentary for the extended version. Also included on the Razor disc are deleted scenes, two featurettes—"The Look of Battlestar Galactica" and "My Favorite Episode So Far", as well as a sneak peek at season 4. For the other discs, special features include creator Ronald D. Moore's podcast commentaries on 7 of the 10 episodes; podcasts for "Guess What's Coming to Dinner?" and "Sine Qua Non" were not recorded, while a podcast for "Faith" was recorded and is available on the official website but is not included on the sets due to the recording quality. With that, new commentaries were recorded for the DVD. Moore, along with writers Bradley Thompson and David Weddle provide commentary for "Faith"; Moore and writer Michael Angeli provide commentary for "Guess What's Coming to Dinner?"; and Moore and writer Michael Taylor prove commentary for "Sine Qua Non". Moore is joined by writer Jane Espenson, editor Michael O'Halloran and supervising editor Andrew Seklir on his podcast commentary for "The Hub"; and is joined by writers Bradley Thompson and David Weddle, and editor Julius Ramsay on his podcast commentary for "Revelations". Also included are deleted scenes for every episode, ten David Eick videoblogs, three featurettes—"The Journey", "Cylons: The Twelve", and "The Music of Battlestar Galactica", as well as a sneak peek of season 4.5 and a trailer for Caprica.

The Season 4.5 DVD set includes the last 10 episodes of season four. Special features include creator Ronald D. Moore's podcast commentaries on all 10 episodes. There are also three unaired extended episodes, for "A Disquiet Follows My Soul", "Islanded in a Stream of Stars", and "Daybreak". The extended episodes feature commentary tracks; writer and director Ronald D. Moore on "A Disquiet Follows My Soul"; series star and episode director Edward James Olmos on "Islanded in a Stream of Stars"; and executive producers Ronald D. Moore and David Eick and director Michael Rymer on "Daybreak". Also included are deleted scenes for various episodes, 11 David Eick videoblogs, and five featurettes—"Evolution of a Cue", "And They Have a Plan", "The Journey Ends: The Arrival", "What the Frak is Going on With Battlestar Galactica?", and "A Look Back".

References

External links
 
 

4
2008 American television seasons
2009 American television seasons
Split television seasons